Rok Hanžič (born 6 April 1981) is a retired Slovenian football defender who last played for Domžale in the Slovenian PrvaLiga.

References

External links
NZS profile 

1981 births
Living people
Footballers from Ljubljana
Slovenian footballers
Association football fullbacks
NK IB 1975 Ljubljana players
NK Ljubljana players
NK Svoboda Ljubljana players
NK Domžale players
Slovenian Second League players
Slovenian PrvaLiga players
Slovenia youth international footballers
Slovenia under-21 international footballers
Slovenian football managers
NK Radomlje managers